Cantharocybe brunneovelutina is a species of the family Hygrophoraceae.

References

Hygrophoraceae
Fungi described in 2011